Stephen Michael Kunken (born c. 1971) is an American actor. He is known for the roles of Ari Spyros on Showtime's Billions and Commander Putnam on Hulu's The Handmaid's Tale. His film work includes work with Martin Scorsese, Steven Spielberg, Woody Allen, Paul Greengrass, Ang Lee, Barry Levinson, Ron Howard and others. Graduating with top honors from The Juilliard School Kunken has an extensive and celebrated theater career appearing on Broadway in 7 different Productions and countless off-Broadway and Regional productions. He is most readily known for playing Andy Fastow in the Broadway play Enron, for which he received a Tony Award nomination for Featured Actor in a Play. Other Broadway credits include Frost/Nixon and Rock 'n' Roll'.

Early life and education
Kunken was raised on Long Island in Upper Brookville, New York. His father is a dentist and his mother is a former grade school teacher. Kunken received a B.A. degree from Tufts University in 1993. He is a graduate of the Juilliard School's Graduate Acting program, where as a member of the Drama Division's Group 26 (1993–1997) he was awarded both The John Houseman Prize and the Pearl and Rolands Grant.  His classmates included David Denman and Alan Tudyk. He is Jewish.

Career
Kunken has appeared on Broadway as David Halberstam in David Auburn's The Columnist (2012); opposite Kathleen Turner in High (2011); Tom Stoppard’s Rock 'n' Roll (2007); Frost/Nixon (2007) (for which he received Outer Critics Circle Award (Outstanding Featured Actor in a Play) and Drama League Award nominations),; Festen (2006); and Proof (replacement, 2002). For his role as CFO Andrew Fastow in Lucy Prebble's Enron, he received a 2010 Tony Award nomination for Featured Actor in a Play.

Off-Broadway, he played Tim Andrews in the award-winning Richard Nelson cycle of Apple Plays, which includes That Hopey Changey Thing, Sweet and Sad, and Regular Singing in 2013 at The Public.That Hopey Changey Thing lortel.org, retrieved October 29, 2017

He played the title role as Nikolai Nabakov in Lincoln Center Theater's production of Richard Nelson's Nikolai and the Others in 2013. He has appeared as Dr. Phil in the critically acclaimed production of Kate Fodor's romantic comedy RX (2012, Primary Stages production); as the Stage Manager in the 2009 David Cromer-directed revival of Thornton Wilder's Our Town (replacement as of January 5, 2010, Barrow Street Theatre); Theresa Rebeck's Our House (2009, Playwrights Horizons); Fabulation at Playwrights Horizons (2004); A Very Common Procedure by Courtney Baron at Manhattan Class Company (2007) (for which he received a Drama League Award nomination); Journals of Mihail Sebastian by David Auburn with the Keen Company in 2004 and Misalliance at the Roundabout Theatre Company (1997)."Kunken Off-Broadway" lortel.org, retrieved October 29, 2017

He performed in The Story (2003), Henry VIII (1997) and A Dybbuk (1997) at the Public Theater.

Regionally, Kunken has appeared in Quartermaine’s Terms (2009), True West (2009), Three Sisters as Solyony (2008) all at the Williamstown Theatre Festival; and Mister Roberts as Doc at the Kennedy Center in 2005, among many other credits.

His television credits include: Unforgettable, Blue Bloods, The Good Wife, Gossip Girl, The Unusuals, New Amsterdam, Law & Order, Law & Order: Criminal Intent, Law & Order: SVU, The Sopranos, Spin City, Far East (2001, TV movie), Mary and Rhoda (2000, TV movie) and The Affair."Stephen Kunken Film and TV" hollywood.com, retrieved October 30, 2017

In film, Kunken's work includes The Wolf of Wall Street (2013), Still Alice (2014), Café Society (2016), A Birder's Guide to Everything (2013), The Bay (2012), Price Check (2012), Extremely Loud and Incredibly Close (2011), All Good Things (2010), Taking Woodstock (2009), The Girl in the Park (2008), Wait 'til This Year, Light and the Sufferer (2014), and Bamboozled'' (2000).

Personal life
Kunken is married to stage director Jenn Thompson since September 2005. The couple reside in Brooklyn with their daughter, Naomi, whom they adopted from Ethiopia.

Filmography

References

External links
 
 
 

1970s births
American male television actors
Male actors from New York (state)
Living people
Juilliard School alumni
People from Long Island
Tufts University alumni
21st-century American male actors
American male stage actors
American male film actors
20th-century American male actors
Jewish American male actors
People from Upper Brookville, New York
21st-century American Jews